Ross Parker (born 31 October 1935) is an Australian hurdler. He competed in the men's 400 metres hurdles at the 1956 Summer Olympics.

References

External links
 

1935 births
Living people
Athletes (track and field) at the 1956 Summer Olympics
Australian male hurdlers
Olympic athletes of Australia
Place of birth missing (living people)
20th-century Australian people
21st-century Australian people